Neil J. Lynch (born September 18, 1934) is an American politician in the state of Montana. He served in the Montana Senate and was its majority leader from 1973 to 1977. In 1976, he ran for a seat on the Montana Supreme Court, but was defeated by Democratic candidate Daniel J. Shea, in what was described as an upset.

References

1934 births
Living people
Politicians from Butte, Montana
Catholic University of America alumni
Montana lawyers
Republican Party Montana state senators